Cher Calvin (born August 1, 1974) is a news presenter for KTLA television in Los Angeles.

Biography
Born Cherlynn Calvin on August 1, 1974 in New York City, she is the daughter of the former Filipino actor Roger Calvin. She graduated from the Marymount School of New York in 1992, a college preparatory Catholic high school for girls on the Upper East Side of Manhattan. She is a New York University graduate with a BA in broadcast journalism and a minor in political science.

Career
After Calvin hosted Mornings @ GMA (a now-defunct morning show of GMA Network from 1998 to 1999), she started with KTLA in Los Angeles in January 2005. She has won 7 Emmy awards for news journalism, winning 5 consecutive years (2012-2017), and has received 5 Golden Mike awards, all while reporting for KTLA. Calvin came to KTLA from KVVU-TV Fox 5 in Las Vegas, Nevada, where she was a presenter for Fox 5 News This Morning, replacing Sharon Tay. She is also a former news presenter for News Central on the Filipino television network Studio 23, and she was one of the hosts of the fashion magazine show F! on the Filipino television network ABS-CBN.

Her acting credits include Hancock (2008), Chuck (2007), Criminal Minds (2005), and The Closer (2012). In her  appearance on The Closer, she portrayed herself as a reporter with KTLA.

Personal life
Calvin is Filipino American. She speaks English and Tagalog and participates in many Filipino, Asian community and KTLA-sponsored public community events. She has participated in The Vagina Monologues  at the Center for the Pacific Asian Family to help stop violence against women around the world.

References

External links

1974 births
Living people
American writers of Filipino descent
American people of Kapampangan descent
American television reporters and correspondents
American women television journalists
Journalists from California
Journalists from Las Vegas
Television anchors from Las Vegas
Television anchors from Los Angeles
New York University alumni
ABS-CBN News and Current Affairs people
21st-century American women